All Together Now may refer to:

Films
All Together Now (1986 film), a British television film by Peter Buckman in the anthology series ScreenPlay
All Together Now (2008 film), a film following the creation of The Beatles LOVE by Cirque du Soleil
All Together Now (2020 film), a teen film starring Auli'i Cravalho

Music
"All Together Now" (Beatles song), a song by The Beatles from their album Yellow Submarine
"All Together Now" (The Farm song)
All Together Now (Argent album)
All Together Now (Better Than Ezra album)
"All Together Now", a song by Alabama from the Sesame Street film soundtrack: Follow that Bird

Television
 All Together Now (1991 Australian TV series), an Australian comedy television series (1991-1993)
All Together Now (Philippine TV series), a 2003 Philippine comedy series
All Together Now (franchise), a reality television singing competition format created in the UK 
All Together Now (UK TV series), a UK talent TV series launched in 2018
All Together Now (UK series 1), 2018
All Together Now (UK series 2), 2019
All Together Now (2018 Australian TV series), the Australian version 
All Together Now (Italian TV series), the Italian version, 2019-2020 
Śpiewajmy razem. All Together Now, the Polish version, 2018-2019
All together now (Argentine TV series), the Argentinian version, 2022

Others
 All Together Now, an Australian not-for-profit organisation that runs a program against far-right extremism
All Together Now (book), a book by Jared Bernstein

See also
 All Together (disambiguation)
 "Together Now", a 1998 single by Olivia Lufkin, Jean Michel Jarre & Tetsuya Komuro